Gideon Mensah (born 9 October 2000) is a Ghanaian professional footballer who plays for Swedish club Varbergs BoIS, as a defender.

Club career
Mensah spent his early career with the Right to Dream Academy and Danish club FC Nordsjælland, before signing a loan deal with Swedish club Varbergs BoIS in July 2020. In October 2020 it was announced that the loan would be made permanent from January 2021.

International career
Mensah represented Ghana at the 2017 FIFA U-17 World Cup.

References

2000 births
Living people
Ghanaian footballers
Right to Dream Academy players
FC Nordsjælland players
Varbergs BoIS players
Allsvenskan players
Association football defenders
Ghana youth international footballers
Ghanaian expatriate footballers
Ghanaian expatriate sportspeople in Denmark
Expatriate men's footballers in Denmark
Ghanaian expatriate sportspeople in Sweden
Expatriate footballers in Sweden